United Nations Security Council Resolution 212, adopted unanimously on September 20, 1965, after examining the application of the Maldive Islands for membership in the United Nations, the Council recommended to the General Assembly that the Maldive Islands be admitted.

See also
List of United Nations Security Council Resolutions 201 to 300 (1965–1971)

References
Text of the Resolution at undocs.org

External links
 

 0212
History of the Maldives
Foreign relations of the Maldives
 0212
 0212
September 1965 events
1965 in the Maldives